Naqdi-ye Olya (also Romanized as Nāqdī-ye ‘Olyā and Noqdī-ye ‘Olyā; also known as Naghdi Olya, Naqdī, Naqdī-ye Bālā, Noqdeh-ye Yūkhārī, Noqdī, Noqdī-ye Bālā, and Nugdi) is a village in Naqdi Rural District of Meshgin-e Sharqi District, Meshgin Shahr County, Ardabil province, Iran. At the 2006 census, its population was 1,561 in 386 households. The following census in 2011 counted 1,178 people in 366 households. The latest census in 2016 showed a population of 738 people in 302 households; it was the largest village in its rural district.

References 

Meshgin Shahr County

Towns and villages in Meshgin Shahr County

Populated places in Ardabil Province

Populated places in Meshgin Shahr County